Greg Windsperger (born December 30, 1951 in Minneapolis) is an American former ski jumper who competed in the 1976 Winter Olympics.

References

1951 births
Living people
American male ski jumpers
Olympic ski jumpers of the United States
Ski jumpers at the 1976 Winter Olympics
Skiers from Minneapolis